Arkady Józef Rzegocki (born August 22, 1971 in Tarnobrzeg) is a Polish political scientist, an assistant professor of the Jagiellonian University in Krakow. Between 2016 and 2021 he served as the Republic of Poland Ambassador to the United Kingdom. Head of The Foreign Service in the Ministry of Foreign Affairs (since 2021)

Career 
Rzegocki graduated from the Jagiellonian University. Between 1996 and 2010 he worked at the Department of History of Political and Legal Doctrines of the Faculty of Law and Administration of the Jagiellonian University in Cracow. Since 2010 he has been an assistant professor at the Faculty of International and Political Studies of the Jagiellonian University.

He was an associate professor of the Polish University Abroad in London (2011–2016). In 2011, he founded Jagiellonian University Polish Research Centre in London.

He was a councillor for the City of Kraków from 2014 to 2016, elected as a conservative Law and Justice candidate.

Private life 
Arkady Rzegocki is married to English philologist and theatre historian Jolanta Rzegocka, who is fluent in English, Lithuanian and Russian and knows the basics of French and Hungarian. They have three daughters.

See also
 List of Ambassadors of Poland to the United Kingdom
 Poland–United Kingdom relations

References 

Ambassadors of Poland to the United Kingdom
1971 births
Living people
Jagiellonian University alumni
Academic staff of Jagiellonian University
People from Tarnobrzeg